The canton of Montbrison is a French administrative division located in the department of Loire and the Auvergne-Rhône-Alpes region. At the French canton reorganisation which came into effect in March 2015, the canton was expanded from 19 to 31 communes:

Bard
Boisset-Saint-Priest
Chalain-d'Uzore
Chalain-le-Comtal
La Chapelle-en-Lafaye
Chazelles-sur-Lavieu
Chenereilles
Écotay-l'Olme
Grézieux-le-Fromental
Gumières
L'Hôpital-le-Grand
Lavieu
Lérigneux
Lézigneux
Luriecq
Magneux-Haute-Rive
Margerie-Chantagret
Marols
Montarcher
Montbrison
Mornand-en-Forez
Précieux
Roche
Saint-Georges-Haute-Ville
Saint-Jean-Soleymieux
Saint-Paul-d'Uzore
Saint-Romain-le-Puy
Saint-Thomas-la-Garde
Savigneux
Soleymieux
Verrières-en-Forez

See also
Cantons of the Loire department

References

Cantons of Loire (department)